Pontianak Menjerit, directed by Yusof Kelana in 2005, is a comedy horror flick about siblings' quarrel over a will worth million dollars to be inherited by their belated father.

Plot
Datuk Pengeran Abdul Rahman has asked his lawyer to find the people to inherit his fortune worth RM30 million. Besides his two sons, Azlee, a businessman and Mazlan, a fashion designer, there are still two more people on the list. One of them is Saiful, an orphan and a mechanic who do not see that he will be inheriting his dad's million-dollar fortune, because he has never seen his dad before. The other is Ratnapuri, a Thai woman. Azlee, Datuk's eldest son, cannot accept the presence of Saiful and also Ratnapuri when his father's will is read at Datuk's residence.

Cast
 Ziana Zain as Ziana
 Juliana Banos as Julia
 Azlee Jaafar as Azlee
 Faizal Hussein as Yassin
 Lan Pet Pet as Mazlan
 Zed Zaidi as Saiful
 Sheila Rusly as Ratana Puri
 Zarina Zainoordin as Zarina
 Nursyella as Syella
 Jalaluddin Hassan as Mr. Salleh (Lawyer)
 Angelina Tan as Inspector Angelina
 Osman Kering as Bomoh Hantu
 Amran Tompel as Pak Mail
 Corrie Lee as Somchai
 Julia Hana as Pontianak
 Raja Noor Baizura as Datin
 A. Galak as Datuk Pangeran Abdul Rahman

Release
The film was released on 16 June 2005 and went box office.

Awards and nominations
18th Malaysian Film Festival, 2005
 Best Cinematography - Indra Che Muda (Won)
 Best Actress in Supporting Role - Sheila Rusly - Nominated
 Best Editor - Nominated
 Best Film - Nominated
 Best Music Score - Nominated
 Best Screenplay - Nominated
 Best Sound - Nominated

References

External links
 

2005 films
2005 comedy horror films
2005 horror films
Malay-language films
Malaysian comedy horror films
Skop Productions films
Films produced by Yusof Haslam
2005 comedy films